Performing arts center/centre (see spelling differences), often abbreviated as PAC, is used to refer to:

 A multi-use performance space that is intended for use by various types of performing arts, including dance, music and theatre.

The intended multiple use of performing arts centers in this sense differentiates them from single-purpose concert halls, opera houses or theatres, although the actual use of single-purpose spaces for other than their intended use is widespread. This sort of space has a long history, extending to the Roman Colosseum and Greek amphitheatres.

 A cluster of performance spaces, either separate buildings or under one roof, each space designed for a specific purpose such as symphonic music or chamber music or theatre, but multipurpose as a whole. The modern version of this came into being only in the 1960s.

Examples of this type of PAC are the Kennedy Center in Washington, D.C., the Sydney Opera House, and the Lincoln Center in New York City.

Some performing arts center organizations act as sole presenters for events using the venues within the center, but most also frequently rent their performance spaces to other performing arts presenters or self-presenting performing arts groups. An example of this practice is the Celebrity Series of Boston renting venues in Boston's Boch Center.

New performing arts centers emerged in the latter part of the 20th century as a means of generating new investment and increased economic activity and thus, a means for revitalizing neighborhoods as patrons are drawn to local restaurants and other businesses. PACs became a draw for touring shows and eventually included visual art in their facilities. Today, these centers are valuable civic resources that provide education, access, exchange of creative discourse, opportunities for cultural expression and awareness.

History
The origin of the world's oldest performing art, Noh, dates back to the 6th and 7th centuries when performing arts came to Japan from mainland China.

Starting in the 6th century BC, the Classical period of performing art began in Greece, ushered in by the tragic poets such as Sophocles. These poets wrote plays which, in some cases, incorporated dance (see Euripides). The Hellenistic period began the widespread use of comedy. Much of which was performed live in a center-point of the community.

In 1576, Britain's first playhouse, 'The Theatre' was built in Finsbury Fields, London. It was constructed by Leicester's Men – an acting company formed in 1559 from members of the Earl of Leicester's household.

Performing arts centers have since flourished and are found in communities large and small around the world.

National Kaohsiung Center for the Arts 
When the National Kaohsiung Center for the Arts opened in Taiwan in October 2018, it became the world's largest performing arts center under one roof. Sprawled across 35 acres within the verdant Weiwuying Metropolitan Park, the facility gives the city of Kaohsiung a dose of culture it yearned for. Designed by Dutch firm Mecanoo, the futuristic building and its undulating roof that could easily be compared to a spaceship immediately impresses upon arrival. Stepping into the plaza is like walking into a steel equivalent of a cave, where the wavy ceiling drops to the floor, carving out pathways for pedestrians, and is dotted with cutouts that afford natural sunlight to seep in.

See also
Auditorium
List of concert halls
List of contemporary amphitheatres
List of opera houses

References

Educational buildings